Amphisbaena kiriri is a species of worm lizard in the family Amphisbaenidae. The species is endemic to northeastern Brazil.

Etymology
The specific name, kiriri, refers to the Kiriri, an indigenous tribe of the Brazilian Caatinga.

Geographic range
A. kiriri is found in Bahia state, Brazil.

Description
A. kiriri is dark gray dorsally, and cream-colored ventrally. Furthermore, the first two to three ventral segments are dark gray in color and the remainder ventral segments are cream colored including the ventral portion of the head and the rest of the belly. It has 158–165 body annuli, and two precloacal pores.

References

Further reading
Ribeiro, Leonardo B.; Gomides, Samuel C.; Costa, Henrique C. (2018). "A New Species of Amphisbaena from Northeastern Brazil (Squamata: Amphisbaenidae)". Journal of Herpetology 52 (2): 234–241. (Amphisbaena kiriri, new species).
Ribeiro, Síria; Sá, Vânia; Santos, Alfredo P., Jr.; Graboski, Roberta; Zaher, Hussam; Guedes, Andrei G.; Andrade, Sheila P.; Vaz-Silva, Wilian (2019). "A new species of the Amphisbaena (Squamata, Amphisbaenidae) from the Brazilian Cerrado with a key for the two-pored species". Zootaxa 4550 (3): 301–320.

kiriri
Reptiles described in 2018
Taxa named by Leonardo de Barros Ribeiro
Taxa named by Samuel Campos Gomides
Taxa named by Henrique Caldeira Costa
Endemic fauna of Brazil
Reptiles of Brazil